Joan L. Hester (née Goshorn; November 20, 1932 – November 19, 2019) was an American politician in the state of Iowa. Hester was born in Persia, Iowa. She was married to Jack W. Hester, who served in the Iowa State Senate. A Republican, she served in the Iowa House of Representatives from 1985 to 1995 (98th district from 1985 to 1993 and 82nd district from 1993 to 1995).

She died on November 19, 2019, in Honey Creek, Pottawattamie County, Iowa at age 86.

References

1932 births
2019 deaths
People from Harrison County, Iowa
Women state legislators in Iowa
Republican Party members of the Iowa House of Representatives
21st-century American women